

Results

Division A

Final standings

Southern League Cup

Group Section 1

Section 1 final table

Knockout stage

Victory Cup

References

AFC Heritage Trust

Aberdeen F.C. seasons
Aber